was a town located in Kitatsuru District, Yamanashi Prefecture, Japan.

As of 2004, the area within the former town of Uenohara had an estimated population of 26555 and a density of 211.58 persons per km2. The total area was 125.51 km2.

History 
On February 13, 2005, Uenohara (formerly from Kitatsuru District), absorbed the village of Akiyama (from Minamitsuru District) to create the city of Uenohara.

Geography
 Mountains: Mount Mikuni, Mount Ōgi, Mount Mitō
 Rivers: Sagami River, Nakama River, Tsuru River

Surrounding municipalities
The following are the municipalities that surrounded the town of Uenohara before it was merged.
 Yamanashi Prefecture
 Ōtsuki
 Kosuge
 Akiyama
 Tokyo
 Hinohara
 Kanagawa Prefecture
 Fujino

External links
  Uenohara City Official Site

Dissolved municipalities of Yamanashi Prefecture

tl:Uenohara, Yamanasyi